Crudia splendens is a species of plant in the family Fabaceae. It is found only in Indonesia.

References

splendens
Endemic flora of Borneo
Flora of Kalimantan
Vulnerable plants
Taxonomy articles created by Polbot